Band Alikhan (also Romanized as Band ‘Alīkhān and Band-e ‘Alī Khān) is a village in Behnamarab-e Jonubi Rural District, Javadabad District, Varamin County, Tehran Province, Iran. At the 2006 census, its population was 19, in 10 families.

References 

Populated places in Varamin County